Ebon Herndon is an American rapper-songwriter, actor, and model, commonly known by his stage name E Reece. He rose to fame in the mid-2000s when he signed a recording contract with Kajmere Sounds in 2005. Reece released his first studio album A New Breed in 2006, which spawned the singles "Everything" and "Life Changes". Following the release of his first album, Reece went on a promo tour in late 2006.

In mid-2008, Reece went on tour with his band "Core Elements" to promote his upcoming second album. In November 2008, Reece released his second album L.I.S.n 2 This Live.In.Studio, which spawned the singles "How We Do", "What U Need", "Mic Check", and "Keep It Movin'". In May 2010, Reece released the lead single "Fly Hi" from his upcoming third album. In July 2010, Reece released his third studio album Concrete Steppin'''. In August 2010, Reece shot a music video for his second single "Confessions of a Dreamer".

Early life
Herndon's father died when he was nine years old. His love of music began when he began to study jazz saxophone at age 12.Acclaim Magazine. Acclaim Magazine's Interview with E Reece, Acclaim Magazine; retrieved February 19, 2011. His early influences include Michael Jackson, Prince, Stevie Wonder and James Brown, A Tribe Called Quest, EPMD, KRS-One. He graduated a magna cum laude and B.S., Mass Communications from Towson University in Baltimore, Maryland.

Musical career
1999–2004: Beginnings
He started freestyling with his friends and would perform on open mic nights at local venues, most notably with the legendary KRS-1 and BET’s ex-Rap City host Tigger at the 930 Club in Washington D.C. in 1999. In 2003, he appeared in the independent film "Claims". In 2004, he released his EP "FarEye Vision". In May and June 2004, Reece was featured in issues of the Japanese hip hop magazine Woffin.

2005–2007: Next Up and A New Breed
In 2005, Reece formed his five-pierce band "Core Elements". In mid-2005, he began recording his first studio album. In 2006, Reece released his second EP, Next Up. In July 2007, Reece began his distribution company "E Reece Music Group" and released a single "Everything" and later released his album "A New Breed". In 2007, he released his second single "Life Changes" and went on a promo tour.

2007–2009: Elevated Mental Recordings and L.I.S.N. 2 This Live.In.Studio
In August 2008, Reece and his band Core Elements appeared at Temple Bar in Santa Monica, California to promote his upcoming second album. Reece shot two music videos for his singles "How We Do" and "What U Need". In August 2008, he began his own record label "Elevated Mental Recordings". In November 2008, Reece released his second album L.I.S.n 2 This Live.In.Studio in Japan. In January 2009, the album was released in the United States. In 2009, Reece released his singles "Mic Check", and "Keepin It Movin'". In 2009, Reece went on the "E Reece & Core Elements Tour" to promote his second album. 

2009–2010: Concrete Steppin'
In mid-2009, Reece began the recording sessions for his third album. In late 2009, Reece signed a record deal with HiPNOTT Records. In December 2009, he released his first mixtape "Art & Commerce: The Mixtape". In May 2010, Reece released the lead single "Fly Hi" from his upcoming third album. In June 2010, Reece released his second mixtape "The RE: Introduction Mixtape" and shot a music video for "Fly Hi."  In July 2010, Reece released his third studio album Concrete Steppin'''. In August 2010, Reece shot a music video for his second single "Confessions of a Dreamer".  In December 2010, Reece began his European tour with MED (Stones Throw).

2011–present: T.iM.E
In 2011, E Reece formed a hip-hop duo with music producer Theimagination called "T.iM.E". In October 2011, the duo released an extended play "The T.iM.E is Now". The EP featured the single "Breakthrough".

Modeling career
He was the first runner-up in Washington D.C.s "Mr. Metropolitan" contest in 1998. He also participated on runway for Alvin King in Washington D.C. and New York City, Travis Winkey in Baltimore.

Discography

Albums
 2007: A New Breed
 2008: L.I.S.n 2 This Live.In.Studio
 2010: Concrete Steppin'

Filmography
 Winter Wonderland (Milo)
 Skippy Peanut Butter (Derek Jeter)
 BET On the Action Tip (Host)
 Punk'd
 MTV Racism PSA
 Seventh on Six
 MTV VMA Promo
 Claims
 I Remember
 Keeping Up with The Kardashians
 MTV The Real World

Tours
 2008: E Reece & Core Elements Tour
 2010: Concrete Steppin' Tour

References

External links
 Official Website

Living people
African-American rappers
African-American record producers
American hip hop record producers
American music industry executives
21st-century American rappers
Year of birth missing (living people)
21st-century African-American musicians